Panchapuri is an urban municipality located in Surkhet District of Karnali Province of Nepal.

The municipality is divided into total 11 wards.

The municipality was established on 10 March 2017, when Government of Nepal restricted old administrative structure and announced 744 local level units as per the new constitution of Nepal 2015.

Salkot, Babiyachaue, Chapre, Bidyapur and Tatopani Village development committee were Incorporated to form this new municipality. The municipality is divided into 11 wards and the headquarters of municipality situated at Babiyachaur

Demographics
At the time of the 2011 Nepal census, Panchapuri Municipality had a population of 32,236. Of these, 92.2% spoke Nepali, 6.2% Magar, 1.0% Raji, 0.3% Newar, 0.1% Maithili and 0.2% other languages as their first language.

In terms of ethnicity/caste, 29.2% were Chhetri, 20.0% Kami, 18.6% Hill Brahmin, 15.6% Magar, 6.6% Damai/Dholi, 2.7% Sanyasi/Dasnami, 2.3% Thakuri, 2.0% Sarki, 1.0% Raji and 2.0% others.

In terms of religion, 91.7% were Hindu, 7.3% Buddhist, 0.9% Christian and 0.1% others.

References

External links
www.panchapurimun.gov.np/

Populated places in Surkhet District
Municipalities in Karnali Province
Nepal municipalities established in 2017